Joseph Mwenya Kasonde was a Zambian politician who served as the Minister of Health from October 2011 to 2016.

Early life and career
Dr Kasonde was a Zambian physician who served as Minister of Health from 2011 to 2016. While serving as Minister, he championed pharmaceutical policy and access to medicines issues, contributing to the re-establishment of Medical Stores Limited, the largest medicines storage and distribution facility in the Southern African Region. He was a founding member of the Lusaka Apex Medical University (LAMU), an institution established as a result of evidence on the magnitude of the human resources for health crisis in Zambia and Africa. LAMU saw the first privately trained Zambian doctors and pharmacists graduating in 2015 and 2016 respectively. 
 
Dr. Kasonde was a graduate of Aberdeen University, Scotland and Fellow of the Royal College of Obstetricians and Gynecologists, London. He completed his PhD at the University of Oxford, and served as Research Fellow with the University of Oxford Department of Obstetrics and Gynecology. He was Chair of the Board of the Tropical Diseases Research Centre in Ndola, Zambia, a precursor to the establishment of the Africa Centre for Disease Control (CDC) Regional Office in Zambia. At WHO HQ in Geneva, he served as Responsible Officer for Research Capacity Strengthening in the Special Programme of Research, Development and Research Training in Human Reproduction. After retiring, he joined the Council on Health Research for Development (COHRED) which led to the establishment of the Zambia Forum for Health Research. At the 2013 Global Symposium on Health Systems Research (HSR) he presented the Roles of WHO in assisting country-based knowledge translation platforms (KTP) to develop context specific evidence-informed policies. 
 
In 2013, Dr. Kasonde was the recipient of The Harvard Ministerial Leadership Award, a joint initiative of Harvard with support from the Bill & Melinda Gates Foundation, Bloomberg Philanthropies, the GE Foundation, and the Rockefeller Foundation. In 2016, the President of the Republic of Zambia presented Dr. Kasonde with a lifetime achievement award on behalf of the Zambia Medical Association (ZMA) for his service to medicine in Zambia and globally. In 2018, the ZMA has also introduced the Joseph Mwenya Kasonde Research Award. [END]

Dr Kasonde died on 25 August 2017 at around 21.00hrs after having suffering with liver cancer for some time.

His Excellency President Edgar Chagwa Lungu declared a day of national morning and accorded Dr Kasonde a state funeral in recognition of his lifetime dedication and commitment to serving the people of Zambia.

References

1938 births
2017 deaths
Health ministers of Zambia
Patriotic Front (Zambia) politicians
Alumni of the University of Aberdeen
Members of the National Assembly of Zambia
People from Mazabuka District